Straneostichus is a genus of beetles in the family Carabidae, containing the following species:

 Straneostichus farkaci Sciaky, 1996
 Straneostichus fischeri Sciaky, 1994
 Straneostichus haeckeli Sciaky & Wrase, 1997
 Straneostichus kirschenhoferi Sciaky, 1994
 Straneostichus ovipennis Sciaky, 1994
 Straneostichus puetzi Sciaky & Wrase, 1997
 Straneostichus rotundatus Yu, 1992
 Straneostichus vignai Sciaky, 1994

References

Pterostichinae